Qeshlaq-e Juq-e Sofla (also Romanized as Qeshlāq-e Jūq-e Soflá; also known as Qeshlāq Jūg-e Soflá) is a village in Anguran Rural District, Anguran District, Mahneshan County, Zanjan Province, Iran. At the 2006 census, its population was 95, in 27 families.

References 

Populated places in Mahneshan County